Wilbur James Cash (March 23, 1887 – June 3, 1956) was an American businessman, farmer, and politician.

Cash was born in Gridley, Illinois. He went to the public schools in and lived in Towanda, Illinois with wife and family. Cash involved in the farming, merchant, and banking businesses. He served on the McLean County Board of Supervisors and was chair of the county board. He also served on the Towanda Village Board and was president of the village board. Cash also served as the Towanda town clerk and served on the school board. Cash served in the Illinois Senate from 1941 to 1953 and was a Republican. Cash died at Brokaw Hospital in Normal, Illinois after suffering from a lingering illness.

Notes

External links

1887 births
1956 deaths
People from McLean County, Illinois
Businesspeople from Illinois
Farmers from Illinois
Illinois city council members
School board members in Illinois
County board members in Illinois
Republican Party Illinois state senators
20th-century American politicians
20th-century American businesspeople